Absheron or Apsheron may refer to:

 Absheron (novel) by Mehdi Huseyn
 Absheron District, a rayon of Azerbaijan
 Absheron Economic Region
 Absheron FK, a football club based in Baku, active from 2010 to 2011
 Absheron gas field
 Absheron Hotel
 Absheron National Park
 Absheron Peninsula, Azerbaijan